Daniel Morejón Torres (July 21, 1930 – April 27, 2009) was a Cuban-born professional baseball player. He was a backup outfielder in Major League Baseball who played briefly for the Cincinnati Reds during  July and early August of the  season. He was born in Havana.

In his brief Major League career, Morejón was a .192 hitter (5-for-26) in 12 games, including four runs, one RBI, one stolen base, and a .400 on-base percentage. He did not have an extra base hit.

Morejón played in minor league baseball for 19 seasons (1954–1972) including the Havana Sugar Kings of the International League. In 1955, he was named Most Valuable Player of the Carolina League while playing for the High Point-Thomasville Hi-Toms. After his playing career, he managed and maintained the baseball fields at Tropical Park in Miami, Florida. He died in Miami at the age of 78.

See also
1958 Cincinnati Redlegs season
List of Major League Baseball players from Cuba

External links

Highlights at Cuba Béisbol

1930 births
2009 deaths
Almendares (baseball) players
Broncos de Reynosa players
Cafeteros de Córdoba players
Cincinnati Redlegs players
Defecting Cuban baseball players
Habana players
Havana Sugar Kings players
High Point-Thomasville Hi-Toms players
Industriales de Valencia players
Jacksonville Suns players
Jersey City Jerseys players
Major League Baseball outfielders
Major League Baseball players from Cuba
Cuban expatriate baseball players in the United States
Mexican League baseball players
Miami Beach Flamingos players
Pericos de Puebla players
Portsmouth Merrimacs players
Saraperos de Saltillo players
Savannah Redlegs players
Tigres de Aragua players
Cuban expatriate baseball players in Venezuela
Baseball players from Havana